The New Jersey Civil Service Commission is an independent body within the New Jersey state government under the auspices of the Department of Labor and Workforce Development, established in 1986.

The commission interprets, amends and adopts rules regarding civil service employment in New Jersey. It hears and rules on appeals filed by state, county and municipal employees, employment candidates, and appointing authorities. It acts as an unbiased forum for appeals to be heard and fair, impartial decisions to be rendered. It is responsible for enforcing such decisions.

The Civil Service Commission is composed of is a five-member, bipartisan, public body with a full-time chairperson and four part-time members, each appointed to a four-year term by the Governor of New Jersey with the consent of the New Jersey Senate.

The position of Chair/Chief Executive Officer is a cabinet-level position.

History 

During much of the Christie administration, the Commission operated with three members or was unable to conduct business due to a lack of quorum. The Civil Service Commission continued to be a key organization after the 1947 State Constitution was adopted, and the new Department of Civil Service was founded as one of the major executive agencies.

Chairpersons 

Allison Chris Myers – Appointed as Acting Chair/CEO by Governor Phil Murphy. January 1, 2023 to present

Deirdré Webster Cobb, Esq. – Appointed by Governor Phil Murphy. March/April 2018 to January 1, 2023

Robert M. Czech – Appointed by Governor Chris Christie. February 22, 2010 to February 2018.

See also
Governorship of Chris Christie
Governorship of Phil Murphy

References

External links 

Civil Service Commission
Government agencies established in 1986
1986 establishments in New Jersey
Labor relations in New Jersey